Elena Frías de Chávez (born May 14, 1935) is the mother of late Venezuelan president Hugo Chávez, Aníbal José Chávez Frías and Adán Chávez. She is the former First Lady of the state of Barinas and wife of Governor Hugo de los Reyes Chávez. She grew up in the village of San Hipólito, close to the capital city of Barinas, and met her husband, Hugo de los Reyes Chávez, when she was 16 and he was 19 and working as a rural schoolteacher. She has raised six sons, including Hugo, her second born.

References

21st-century Venezuelan women politicians
21st-century Venezuelan politicians
Living people
1935 births
People from Barinas (state)
Venezuelan schoolteachers
Chávez family